Hangzhou Bay, or the Bay of Hangzhou, is a funnel-shaped inlet of the East China Sea, bordered by the province of Zhejiang and the municipality of Shanghai, which lies north of the Bay. The Bay extends from the East China Sea to its head at the city of Hangzhou, from which its name is derived.

At Hangzhou, the Qiantang River flows into this Bay, providing freshwater from the West while seawater comes in from the East. Thus, Hangzhou Bay, especially its western end, is sometimes called in the scientific literature as the Qiantang River Estuary.

At the southeast end of Hangzhou Bay, off Ningbo, are many small islands that are collectively called the Zhoushan Islands.  This archipelago of islands is urbanized with the administrative status of a prefecture-level city in Zhejiang Province.

At less than 15 meters in depth, the entire Bay is relatively shallow. Consequently, the main port in the Bay area is the one in Ningbo and Zhoushan, at the southeast end of the Bay on the coast of East China Sea.

Qiantang River tidal bore 

Yanguan Town Tide-Viewing Park (盐官镇观潮胜地公园 Yánguān Zhèn Guāncháo Shèngdì Gōngyuán), on the north shore of Hangzhou Bay some 50 km east of the city of Hangzhou, is regarded as one of the best place to watch the Qiantang River Tidal Bore, especially on the 18th day of the eighth lunar month.

Bay bridges 

The Bay was first spanned by the Hangzhou Bay Bridge, which was linked up on June 14, 2007, and opened on May 1, 2008. It is a long  bridge carrying  expressway, three lanes each way, with two separate cable-stayed portions and a service center at the bridge midpoint. It runs across the mouth of Hangzhou Bay connecting the municipalities of Jiaxing and Ningbo in Zhejiang province.

The second bridge crossing of the Bay is the Jiashao Bridge, located west of the Hangzhou Bay Bridge, and completed in 2013. The Jiashao Bridge connects Shaoxing on the south shore of the Bay to a point on the north shore of the Bay due south of Jiaxing and provides a more direct route for vehicle traffic between Shaoxing and Shanghai.

Another bridge is planned which will carry the Nantong–Ningbo high-speed railway.

Hangzhou Great Bay Area 
In 2018, the Zhejiang provincial government, following in Guangdong's footsteps, released ambitious plans for the Hangzhou Great Bay Area, aiming for a mega urban re-development schema that would double the economic output of the region by 2022 and develop a “world class” bay area in Zhejiang by 2035. The Great Bay Area, an economic and industrial belt centered around Hangzhou Bay, is home to about 40 million people and, as of 2017, accounts for 87 percent of the province's economic output. The challenge to Zhejiang's vision may be its interaction with Shanghai.

See also
 Qiantang River
 Tidal bore
 Port of Ningbo-Zhoushan
 Yangtze River Delta

References 

Bays of China
Bodies of water of Zhejiang